Iqbalur Rahim is a Bangladesh Awami League politician and the incumbent member of parliament for Dinajpur-3.

Career
Rahim was elected to Parliament from Dinajpur-3 in 2008 as a Bangladesh Awami candidate. He was re-elected on 5 January 2014 from Dinajpur-3.

Rahim laid the foundation stone of a bridge over Dhepa River in Dinajpur on 23 October 2011 and then on 10 November 2011, Khalid Mahmud Chowdhury, Member of Parliament from Dinajpur-2 laid the foundation stone on the other side. On 15 February 2014 he visited Hindu families in Chirirbandar upazila, Dinajpur District attacked by members of Jamaat-e-Islami Bangladesh, Islami Chhatra Shibir, and Bangladesh Nationalist Party following the 5 January 2014 General Elections in Bangladesh. He is a whip in the parliament of Bangladesh.

Award
World Leadership Federation (WLF), a global platform based in India, has nominated Iqbalur Rahim, the whip of the Bangladesh Parliament, for WLF Award-2017 for his outstanding contribution to social services. The WLF has decided to give him the award in the social innovator category and the award will be handed over to Iqbalur Rahim on February 23 at a gala event in Dubai. The federation has chosen Iqbalur Rahim, a ruling Bangladesh Awami League lawmaker elected from Dinajpur, to construct and maintain a shelter house "Manab Palli" for transsexuals under his constituency.

Personal life 
His father, M. Abdur Rahim, was Member of Parliament from the same constituency and famous politician from Dinajpur who was awarded Independence Day Award. His only brother M Enayetur Rahim is a justice on the Appellate Division of Bangladesh Supreme Court.

References

Awami League politicians
Living people
10th Jatiya Sangsad members
11th Jatiya Sangsad members
9th Jatiya Sangsad members
1965 births